Sans Plus Attendre is the debut album by Belgian singer Axelle Red, released in 1993.

Five singles were taken from the album: "Kennedy Boulevard", "Elle danse seule", "Je t'attends", "Sensualité" and "Le monde tourne mal".

Track listing
 "Elle danse seule" (Richard Seff) – 4:01
 "Amoureuse ou pas" (Edward Holland, Lamont Dozier, Brian Holland, Axelle Red) – 3:23
 "Vendredi soir" (Brian Nelson, Red) – 2:55
 "Sensualité" (Albert Hammond, Shelly Peiken, Red) – 3:50
 "Le monde tourne mal" (R. Seff) – 5:18
 "Pars" (Daniel Seff, R. Seff) – 3:08
 "Je t'attends" (D. Seff, R. Seff) – 3:33
 "Un homme ou une femme" (Wigbert Van Lierde, Red) – 3:28
 "Femme au volant" (Van Lierde, Red) – 3:41
 "Les voisins" (D. Seff, R. Seff)  – 3:35
 "Présence" (D. Seff, R. Seff) – 4:05
 "Kennedy Boulevard" (D. Seff, R. Seff) – 3:42

Charts

Weekly charts

Year-end charts

Certifications

References

1993 debut albums
Axelle Red albums
Virgin Records albums